Davis Polk & Wardwell LLP, better known as Davis Polk is a white-shoe, international law firm headquartered in New York City with 980 attorneys worldwide and offices in Washington, D.C., Northern California, London, Madrid, Hong Kong, Beijing, Tokyo, and São Paulo. The firm has consistently been recognized as a global leader in banking & financial services as well as in capital markets.

History 
Davis Polk traces its origin to a one-man practice in Manhattan opened by a 21-year-old lawyer, Francis N. Bangs. The firm changed its name several times to account for new partners, using names such as Bangs & Stetson; Bangs, Stetson, Tracey & MacVeagh, and Stetson, Jennings & Russell. Towards the end of the 19th century, J. P. Morgan hired Francis Stetson, then name partner of the firm, as his chief counsel. During Stetson's tenure, the firm helped Morgan to restructure the Pennsylvania Railroad as well as create General Electric. The modern incarnations of Morgan's business, JPMorgan Chase and Morgan Stanley, have remained key clients of the firm. Among other high-profile lawyers, President Grover Cleveland served as a member of the firm during the interval between his two non-consecutive presidential terms.

The firm was located at 15 Broad Street from around 1889 to 1962, and then at One Chase Manhattan Plaza until 1992. The firm voted in 1967 to take its current name from three of the firm's most influential partners from the early-to-mid 20th century: John W. Davis, Frank Polk, and Allen Wardwell.

In 1935, In response to the Glass–Steagall Act of 1932, the firm performed the legal work to spin off the investment banking arm of J.P. Morgan & Co., which became known as Morgan Stanley.

In 1938, the firm represented Erie Railroad in the landmark case Erie Railroad Co. v. Tompkins, 304 U.S. 64 (1938), in which Justice Louis Brandeis introduced the Erie doctrine.

In 1952, John W. Davis represented U.S. Steel and successfully challenged the constitutionality of President Harry S. Truman's attempted takeover of the company in a famous case that has been referenced by most legal scholars today to assess executive power (see Youngstown Sheet & Tube Co. v. Sawyer, 343 U.S. 579 (1952)).

In 1962, the firm opened its first overseas office in Paris.

In 1971, Lydia Kess was the first woman to be promoted to partner, becoming the second female partner at a major Wall Street law firm.

In 1981, the firm played an important role in negotiating the financial aspects of the resolution of the Iranian hostage crisis.

In 1998, the firm advised Exxon on its $81 billion merger with Mobil, the largest merger in history at the time.

In 2000, the firm advised its long-term client, J.P. Morgan & Co., on its merger with Chase Manhattan Bank to form JPMorgan Chase.

From 1999 to 2010, the firm worked on the initial public offerings of United Parcel Service, AT&T Wireless, Industrial and Commercial Bank of China, Visa Inc., General Motors and Agricultural Bank of China, some of the largest IPOs in history.

During the financial crisis of 2007–2008, the firm represented many government clients, including the United States Department of the Treasury and the Federal Reserve Bank of New York, and the firm had important roles in the AIG, Freddie Mac, Lehman Brothers, and Citigroup matters, as well as in the drafting of the Dodd–Frank Act.

In 2009, to bolster its financial regulatory practice, the firm hired three former Securities and Exchange Commission officials: Commissioner Annette Nazareth, Director of Enforcement Linda Chatman Thomsen, and Deputy Director of Trading and Markets Robert Colby—as well as former White House Staff Secretary Raul Yanes and former Federal Deposit Insurance Corporation General Counsel John Douglas.

Controversy about race relations
John W. Davis's legal career is most remembered for his final appearance before the Supreme Court, in which he unsuccessfully defended the "separate but equal" doctrine in Briggs v. Elliott, a companion case to Brown v. Board of Education. Davis, as a defender of racial segregation and state control of education, argued that South Carolina had shown good faith in attempting to eliminate any inequality between black and white schools and should be allowed to continue to do so without judicial intervention. 
He expected to win, most likely through a divided Supreme Court, even after the matter was re-argued after the death of Chief Justice Fred M. Vinson. After the Supreme Court unanimously ruled against his client's position, he returned the $25,000 (equivalent to $ in ), that he had received from South Carolina, although he was not required to do so, but kept a silver tea service that had been presented to him. It has also been reported that he never charged South Carolina in the first place. He declined to participate further in the case, as he did not wish to be involved in the drafting of decrees to implement the Court's decision.

In Guinn v. United States, as Solicitor General, while he argued against the legality of the “grandfather clause”, he conceded the legality of the literacy tests, which was used to disenfranchise African Americans and others.

Notable attorneys and alumni

Current attorneys
Among its current partners and counsel are:

 Uzo Asonye – former Deputy Chief of the Financial Crimes and Public Corruption office of the Eastern District of Virginia and member of the office of special counsel Robert Mueller
 Jon Leibowitz – former chairman, Federal Trade Commission
 Gary Lynch – former Director, Enforcement Division, Securities and Exchange Commission, and former vice-chairman and Chief Legal Officer, Morgan Stanley, former vice-chairman, Credit Suisse, and former Global General Counsel, Bank of America
 Neil MacBride – former U.S. Attorney, Eastern District of Virginia
 Annette Nazareth – former commissioner, Securities and Exchange Commission
 Howard Shelanski – former administrator, Office of Information and Regulatory Affairs
 Linda Chatman Thomsen – former director, Enforcement Division, Securities and Exchange Commission
 Kenneth Wainstein – former Assistant Attorney General, National Security Division, Department of Justice, and former Homeland Security Advisor

Former attorneys

Judiciary
 Ronnie Abrams – U.S. District Court Judge, Southern District of New York
 Thomas J. Aquilino – Senior Judge, U.S. Court of International Trade
 Richard M. Berman – U.S. District Court Judge, Southern District of New York
 Miriam Goldman Cedarbaum – Senior U.S. District Court Judge, Southern District of New York
 Denny Chin – U.S. Circuit Court Judge, Second Circuit Court of Appeals
 Hardy Cross Dillard – International Court of Justice
 Warren Eginton – Senior U.S. District Court Judge, District of Connecticut
 Thomas P. Griesa – Senior U.S. District Court Judge, Southern District of New York
 Cheryl Ann Krause – U.S. Circuit Court Judge, Third Circuit Court of Appeals
 J. Michael Luttig – former U.S. Circuit Court Judge, Fourth Circuit Court of Appeals
 Amy J. St. Eve – U.S. Circuit Court Judge, Seventh Circuit Court of Appeals
 Louis L. Stanton – Senior U.S. District Court Judge, Southern District of New York
 John M. Walker Jr. – U.S. Circuit Court Judge, Second Circuit Court of Appeals
 Lawrence Edward Walsh – former U.S. District Court Judge, Southern District of New York

Elected office
 John Danforth – former U.S. Senator (R-MO) and Ambassador to the United Nations
 Kirsten Gillibrand – U.S. Senator (D-NY)
 Ben McAdams – U.S. Representative, Utah's 4th congressional district
 Terri Sewell – U.S. Representative, Alabama's 7th congressional district
 Chen Show Mao – Member of Singaporean Parliament, Aljunied Group Representation Constituency, Workers' Party of Singapore
 Mondaire Jones – U.S. Representative-elect, New York's 17th congressional district

Law enforcement and financial regulation

 Jerome Powell – chairman of the Federal Reserve
 Randal Quarles – vice-chairman for Supervision, Federal Reserve
 Paul S. Atkins – former commissioner, Securities and Exchange Commission
 Roger W. Ferguson Jr. – former vice-chairman, Federal Reserve System; President & CEO, TIAA-CREF
 Robert B. Fiske – Former U.S. Attorney for the Southern District of New York
 Samuel Hazard Gillespie Jr. – Former U.S. Attorney, Southern District of New York
 Charles E. F. Millard – former director, Pension Benefit Guaranty Corporation
 Ogden Livingston Mills – former Secretary of the Treasury
 Lawrence Edward Walsh – former Deputy Attorney General and Independent Counsel, Iran-Contra Investigation

Other government service
 John Bridgeland – former director, United States Domestic Policy Council
 John W. Davis – former United States Solicitor General; Democratic Presidential Nominee, 1924
 Reuben Jeffery III – Under Secretary of State for Economic, Business, and Agricultural Affairs, U.S. Department of State
 Charles MacVeagh – former United States Ambassador to Japan
 Richard Moe – president, National Trust for Historic Preservation
 Jennifer Newstead – legal advisor, U.S. Department of State and Former General Counsel, Office of Management and Budget
 Frank Polk – former acting U.S. Secretary of State
 Peter Tufo – former United States Ambassador to Hungary
 John E. Zuccotti – former deputy mayor, New York City; namesake of Zuccotti Park

Business
 Alexander Cushing – founder and chairman, Ski Corporation
 Eli Whitney Debevoise – founding partner, Debevoise & Plimpton
 Tom Glocer – CEO, Thomson Reuters
 Steven Goldstone – former president & CEO, RJR Nabisco
 Robert Harrison – CEO, Clinton Global Initiative
 Lewis B. Kaden – vice chairman, Citigroup
 H. F. Lenfest – founder, Lenfest Communications
 Charles Li – Chinese banker, former CEO of Hong Kong Stock Exchange
 J. Michael Luttig – general counsel, Boeing
 Axel Miller – chairman & CEO, Dexia S.A.
 David Schwimmer – CEO, London Stock Exchange
 Francis Lynde Stetson – Attorney for John Pierpont Morgan; former president, New York State Bar Association.
 Andrew Yang – entrepreneur, founder of Venture for America, and 2020 presidential candidate
 Reshma Saujani – founder of Girls Who Code

Media and entertainment
 Lisa Daniels – correspondent, NBC News
 He Li – Chinese poet

Academia
 George Bermann – director, European Legal Studies Center, Columbia Law School
 Charles Black – professor, Yale Law School
 Brian Casey – president, Colgate University
 Noah Feldman – professor, Harvard Law School
 Victor Fleischer – professor, University of California, Irvine School of Law
 Barry E. Friedman – vice dean, New York University School of Law
 Ernest Lim – professor, National University of Singapore Faculty of Law
 Linda Lorimer – vice president, Yale University
 Jane B. Korn – cean, Gonzaga University School of Law
 Julie O'Sullivan – professor, Georgetown University Law Center
Saule Omarova – professor, Cornell Law School
 Jeannie Suk – professor, Harvard Law School 
 David Schizer – professor & dean, Columbia Law School
 David E. Van Zandt – president, The New School, Former Dean, Northwestern University School of Law
 Mehrsa Baradaran – University of Georgia School of Law professor; author

Recognitions
In March 2007, Gay Men's Health Crisis (GMHC) awarded Davis Polk its Heroes Honors 25th Anniversary Award for the corporate pro bono work the firm has done on the organization's behalf. In October 2008, a Davis Polk team working with the Asian American Legal Defense and Education Fund won a $4.6 million judgment on behalf of immigrant workers who were being paid below the statutory minimum wage by their employer, a popular Manhattan restaurant.

In 2010, Davis Polk was ranked third in Revenue per Lawyer by the American Lawyer's top 100 National Firms. In 2012 and 2013, Davis Polk was named America's Law Firm of the Year by the International Financial Law Review.

The firm placed 15th on The American Lawyer's 2021 AmLaw 200 ranking, and, on the 2021 Global 200 survey, Davis Polk ranked as the 20th highest grossing law firm in the world.

See also
List of largest law firms by profits per partner
 White shoe firms

References

Further reading
 Oller, John, White Shoe: How a New Breed of Wall Street Lawyers Changed Big Business--and the American Century, Penguin Random House, 2019. 

Law firms based in New York City
1849 establishments in New York (state)
Foreign law firms with offices in Hong Kong
Foreign law firms with offices in Japan